Scuba is an album by the Japanese new wave band P-Model. It is different from other P-Model albums in that it was made almost entirely made by guitarist Susumu Hirasawa alone and for its original issue in the  format: the album was packaged with an 84-page booklet that contained techniques to induce rapid eye movement sleep and hypnosis, the lyric story expanded Scuba Monogatari, photos of the involved band members in a coastal area that illustrated the stories, and an interview with The Stalin vocalist Michiro Endo.

Overview
After the release of P-Model's album Another Game, a process protracted primarily by their then-current label Tokuma Shoten, leader Susumu Hirasawa was exhausted of dealing with major labels, so chose to have the band be independent for some time. In an apartment occupied by friend and former co-worker  film production company AC-Unit, he and a group of friends turned a room into a home studio, and there he and others in various lineups recorded music.

They asked for the group to make the second entry in their burgeoning  line, which would allow them total freedom from Recording Industry Association of Japan censorship.

Bass and drum parts were handled by Hirasawa with a Korg Polysix and a Korg KPR-77. P-Model's rhythm section was in a state of flux at the time. Manager  sought to draw talented personnel to the band. By summer 1984 it had already been decided that Tainaka, who felt he was "at the limit of [his] strength", would leave. Hirose at some point called /After Dinner member  to be the band's new bassist,. then went to current bassist Tatsuya Kikuchi's house to tell him "you are already fired". Tainaka had written one song for the album and Kikuchi recorded basslines for one or two tracks, materials that went unused. The tour for the album featured Tainaka on drums and Yokogawa on bass and other instruments. The promotional photoshoot for Scuba had been done before Kikuchi's dismissal from P-Model, and as such, he was part of the ad campaign for an album he does not appear in, by a band he hadn't been part of for months.

Track listing

Endo's segment on "Looping Opposition" is not present on the CD mix of the track, shortening it by 23 seconds. No recording of this composition by Hirasawa or anyone involved with the album exists.

Personnel
P-Model – Production, Arrangements
Susumu Hirasawa – Vocals, Guitar, Synthesizer, Drum machine, Sampler,  Programming, book text
Shunichi Miura – Synthesizers

Additional personnel
Akemi Tsujitani (AC Unit) – Clothes Construction and Leg, Backing Vocals on "Boat"
Michiro Endo (The Stalin) - Voice on "Looping Opposition" (cassette book version only)
Akiro "Kamio" Arishima (AC Unit) - Synthesizer on "Fish Song"
Mugen Kanzaki (Eco) – Hard Cover Design
Yumiko Onozawa – Red Clothes Making
Yasuhiro Ichikawa (Pool) – Photography
Yūichi Hirasawa (credited as "Yuhichi Hirasawa") – Art director
Model House – Editorial Coordination
Mitsuru Hirose – Artist Management
Special thanks: Kuniharu Kawasaki, Yoshikazu Takahashi, Yuji Matsuda, Kayo Muto

References 
Citations

Bibliography

 .

External links 

1984 albums
P-Model albums
Japanese-language albums